Samuel William Hunt (born December 9, 1942) is an American politician and educator serving as a member of the Washington State Senate from the 22nd district.

Early life and education 
Hunt was born in Billings, Montana. After receiving a degree and teaching certificate from Washington State University, Hunt took post-graduate studies at Washington State University and the University of Oregon.

Career 
He was a public school teacher in Pasco and Montesano, and Governor Booth Gardner's Special Assistant for K-12 Education. Hunt served as a member of the Washington House of Representatives from 2001 to 2017, and was succeeded by Beth Doglio. He was then elected to the Washington State Senate. He represents the 22nd District and serves as the Chair of the State Government, Tribal Relations, and Elections Committee. Hunt also serves on the Early Learning and K-12 Education Committee and the Ways & Means Committee.

Personal life 
Hunt was married for 47 years to Charlene Hunt who died in 2017. Hunt has two grown children and lives in Olympia, Washington.

References

External links
 Sam Hunt at ballotpedia.org
 https://web.archive.org/web/20101027174534/http://www.housedemocrats.wa.gov/members/hunt/bio.asp

1942 births
Living people
Democratic Party members of the Washington House of Representatives
Washington State University alumni
University of Oregon alumni
21st-century American politicians
Democratic Party Washington (state) state senators